The Physiology Society Annual Review Prize Lecture is an award conferred by The Physiological Society. First awarded in 1968, it is one of the premier awards of the society.

Recipients
Recipients of the prize, and their lectures, have included:

 
 
 
 
 
 
 
 
 
 
 
 
 
  
 
 
 
 
 
 
 
 
 
 
 
 
 
 
 
 
 
 
 
 
 
 
 
 
  
 
  (Edwards was unable to deliver his lecture)

References

Academic awards